VII Dwór, read as Siódmy Dwór  (meaning "Seventh Manor House"), is an administrative district (dzielnica) in the city of Gdańsk, Poland.

It borders Oliwa in the north and west, Strzyża in the east, Brętowo in the south and Wrzeszcz Górny in the south-east.

The 7th Polish Navy Hospital is located in VII Dwór.

During the German occupation in World War II, the occupiers operated a subcamp of the Stalag XX-B prisoner-of-war camp for Allied POWs in the present-day district of VII Dwór.

References

Districts of Gdańsk